Georgios Vazakas (born 2 May 1960) is a Greek professional football manager and former player.

References

1960 births
Living people
Sportspeople from Grevena
Greek footballers
Footballers from Western Macedonia
Pierikos F.C. players
Apollon Pontou FC players
Greek football managers
Olympiacos Volos F.C. managers
Apollon Smyrnis F.C. managers
Ethnikos Asteras F.C. managers
A.O. Kerkyra managers
Panionios F.C. managers
Egaleo F.C. managers
Kallithea F.C. managers
Pierikos F.C. managers
Ionikos F.C. managers
Fostiras F.C. managers
Trikala F.C. managers
Kalamata F.C. managers
Ilioupoli F.C. managers
Iraklis Psachna F.C. managers
Acharnaikos F.C. managers
PAS Lamia 1964 managers
AEL Kalloni F.C. managers
Panelefsiniakos F.C. managers
Anagennisi Karditsa F.C. managers
O.F. Ierapetra F.C. managers
Association footballers not categorized by position